Lunca is a commune in Teleorman County, Muntenia, Romania. It is composed of two villages, Lunca and Prundu. It included two other villages until 2004, when they were split off to form Saelele Commune.

References

Communes in Teleorman County
Localities in Muntenia